Jonas Emanuel Falk (3 August 1944 – 26 December 2010) was a Swedish actor and brother of actor Niklas Falk. He was born in Örgryte, Gothenburg.

Jonas Falk had been a member of Stockholm City Theatre's fixed ensemble since 1987. Apart from the City Theatre, he appeared in many of Lars Norén's productions on Sveriges Television. Falk died on 26 December 2010, after a period of illness.

Filmography

 1974 – Fiskeläget
 1983 – Nilla
 1984 – Taxibilder
 1987 – Don Juan
 1988 – Jungfruresan'
 1989 – Förhöret 1989 – 1939 1991 – Goltuppen 1992 – Kejsarn av Portugallien 1993 – Polis polis potatismos 1994 – Läckan 1994 – Mannen på balkongen 1994 – Polismördaren 1994 – Pillertrillaren 1994 – Stockholm Marathon 1995 – Snoken 1996 – Ett sorts Hades 1996 – Sånt är livet 1996 – Ellinors bröllop 1997 – Emma åklagare 1997 - Tre kronor 1997 – Sanning eller konsekvens 1997 – Svensson Svensson 1998 – Kvinnan i det låsta rummet 1998 – Personkrets 3:1 1998 – Waiting for the Tenor 1998 – Under the Sun 1999 – Reuter & Skoog 1999 – Skilda världar 1999 – Sjön 1999 – Vägen ut 1999 – God jul 2000 – The Wide Net 2001 – Skuggpojkarna 2001 – Återkomsten 2001 – En sång för Martin 2001 – Woman with Birthmark 2002 – Bella - bland kryddor och kriminella 2002 - Skeppsholmen 2003 – En ö i havet''

References

External links

1944 births
2010 deaths
Place of death missing
People from Gothenburg
20th-century Swedish male actors
21st-century Swedish male actors